Bentenjima or Bentenshima may refer to:

 Bentenjima Station, Japanese railway station on the Tokaido link
Benten-jima (Wakkanai), deserted island, the northernmost point under Japanese control
 Bentenjima, at the center of Shinobazu Pond in Ueno Park in Tokyo
 Bentenjima, multiple islands: See List of islands of Japan

See also
 Benten Island, English version of name